Andreas Vevera (born 24 September 1971) is a former Austrian para table tennis player and a gold medalist in table tennis at the 2008 Summer Paralympics. He represented Austria and played in the men's individual class 1. His motto is "Give everyday your best."

References

External links 
Home Page (In German)

1971 births
Austrian male table tennis players
Table tennis players at the 2008 Summer Paralympics
Paralympic table tennis players of Austria
Medalists at the 2008 Summer Paralympics
Paralympic medalists in table tennis
Paralympic gold medalists for Austria
Living people
21st-century Austrian people